Agonis undulata is a shrub that is native to Western Australia.

It blooms between March and September producing white flowers. It is found among rocky outcrops along the south coast in the Fitzgerald Biosphere in the Goldfields-Esperance region where it grows in skeletal sandy soils  over quartzite.

References

undulata
Endemic flora of Southwest Australia
Plants described in 1867